Ramsden may refer to:

Places
Ramsden, Orpington, England
Ramsden, Oxfordshire, England, a village and civil parish
Ramsden, Worcestershire, England, a hamlet
Ramsden Park, Toronto, Canada
Ramsden (crater), on the Moon
8001 Ramsden, an asteroid

Other uses
Ramsden (surname), people with the surname
Ramsden Baronets, two baronetcies
USS Ramsden (DE-382), a destroyer escort between 1943 and 1974
Ramsden surveying instruments
Ramsden eyepiece

See also
Ramsdens Cup, the former name for sponsorship reasons of the Scottish Challenge Cup, a Scottish Association Football competition
Harry Ramsden's, British restaurant chain